The 1950 VPI Gobblers football team represented Virginia Polytechnic Institute in the 1950 college football season.  The team was led by their head coach Robert McNeish and finished with a record of zero wins and ten losses (0–10).

Schedule

Players
The following players were members of the 1950 football team according to the roster published in the 1951 edition of The Bugle, the Virginia Tech yearbook.

References

VPI
Virginia Tech Hokies football seasons
College football winless seasons
VPI Gobblers football